Velpke is a Samtgemeinde ("collective municipality") in the district of Helmstedt, in Lower Saxony, Germany. Its seat is in the village Velpke.

The Samtgemeinde Velpke consists of the following municipalities:

 Bahrdorf 
 Danndorf
 Grafhorst 
 Groß Twülpstedt 
 Velpke

Samtgemeinden in Lower Saxony